Mesobaena rhachicephala is a worm lizard species in the family Amphisbaenidae. It is endemic to Pará, Brazil.

References

Mesobaena
Endemic fauna of Brazil
Reptiles of Brazil
Reptiles described in 2009
Taxa named by Marinus Steven Hoogmoed
Taxa named by Roberta Richard Pinto
Taxa named by Wáldima Alves Da Rocha
Taxa named by Emiliane G. Pereira